Davor is a village and a municipality in Brod-Posavina County.

There are a total 3,015 inhabitants in the municipality, in the following settlements:
 Davor, population 2,382
 Orubica, population 633

An absolute majority are Croats (2011 census).

Davor is the birthplace of Croatian football player Ivica Olić, writer Matija Antun Relković, and Bishop Antun Škvorčević.

The village was called Svinjar before 1896.

References

External links
 

Municipalities of Croatia
Populated places in Brod-Posavina County
Bosnia and Herzegovina–Croatia border crossings